The 512th Fighter Squadron is an inactive United States Air Force unit.  Its last assignment was with the 86th Fighter Wing at Ramstein Air Base, Germany, where it was inactivated September 1994.

The squadron was first activated as the 628th Bombardment Squadron in 1943.  While retaining its mission as a ground attack unit, it became the 512th Fighter-Bomber Squadron a few months after activating.  After training in the United States, it moved to the European Theater of Operations in the spring of 1944.  It entered combat soon thereafter, and following D-Day, moved to the continent of Europe, where it gave close air support to American ground forces advancing across Europe.  It earned two Distinguished Unit Citations for its actions during the war.  Following V-E Day, the squadron served in the Army of Occupation until 1946, when it was inactivated and its personnel and equipment transferred to another unit.

The squadron was reactivated in 1952, when it replaced an Air National Guard unit that had been mobilized for the Korean War.  The following year it assumed an air defense mission and continued with that mission until inactivated in 1959.

The squadron was reactivated as the 512th Tactical Fighter Squadron in 1976 and served in that role until 1994, when it transferred its fighters to Aviano Air Base, as its parent wing became an airlift unit.

History

World War II
The squadron was first activated as the 628th Bombardment Squadron at Key Field, Mississippi on 1 March 1943.  It was one of the four original squadrons of the 406th Bombardment Group and was initially equipped with a variety of attack, pursuit, and trainer aircraft.  Although its mission did not substantially change, the squadron became the 512th Fighter-Bomber Squadron in August.  It moved to Congaree Army Air Field, South Carolina and equipping with Republic P-47 Thunderbolts before the end of the year.  The 512th trained with its "Jugs" until March 1944, when it departed the United States for the European Theater of Operations.

The squadron arrived at RAF Ashford in England in early April and flew its first combat mission the following month, preparing for Operation Overlord, the Allied invasion of Normandy.  It attacked military airfields, bridges and marshalling yards in France.  On D-Day, the squadron flew patrols in the vicinity of the invasion beaches and armed reconnaissance and dive bombing missions.

The squadron supported Operation Cobra, the Allied breakthrough at Saint-Lo on 25 July, then moved to Tour-en-Bessin Airfield in France a few days later. The 512th participated in the reduction of Saint-Malo and Brest, France and supported the drive across France.  On 7 September, flying from Saint-Léonard Airfield, the squadron operated with the other units of the 406th Fighter Group in destroying a column of tanks, armored vehicles and motor transport that were trying to escape to southeastern France through the Belfort Gap.  This attack earned the squadron the Distinguished Unit Citation (DUC).  The squadron cooperated with ground forces and flew air interdiction sorties in the area of the Mosel and Saar Rivers.

When the Germans launched the counterattack that resulted in the Battle of the Bulge in December 1944, the squadron shifted operations to the Ardennes to relive the embattled garrison at Bastogne.  For four days in late December, the squadron flew attacks on German vehicles, gun emplacements and defensive positions close to Bastogne, for which it was awarded a second DUC. The squadron flew escort, interdiction, and air support missions in the Ruhr Valley early in 1945 and to assist Allied ground forces in the drive to and across the Rhine.

Following, V-E Day, the squadron moved to AAF Station Nordholz, Germany, where it became part of the Army of Occupation.  The squadron was inactivated on 20 August 1946, and its personnel and equipment were transferred to the 525th Fighter Squadron. which was activated the same day.

Air defense in Europe

The squadron returned to its Fighter-Bomber designation and was activated in July 1952 at RAF Manston, England, where it replaced the 156th Fighter-Bomber Squadron, a North Carolina Air National Guard unit that had been mobilized for the Korean War.  The 512th assumed the mission, personnel and Republic F-84 Thunderjets of the 156th, which was returned to state control.  In late 1953, the squadron converted to North American F-86 Sabres. For a brief time in 1954, the squadron was designated the 512th Fighter-Interceptor Squadron before becoming the 512th Fighter-Day Squadron in August.  In November, the squadron moved to Soesterberg Air Base, Netherlands, where it carried out both fighter-bomber and air defense missions.

On 8 September 1955, United States Air Forces in Europe moved the squadron back to England without personnel or equipment.  The 32d Fighter-Day Squadron was activated at Soesterberg, absorbing the 512th's personnel and equipment, while the 512th assumed the resources of the inactivating 87th Fighter-Interceptor Squadron at RAF Bentwaters and resumed its designation as a fighter interceptor unit and mission of augmenting the air defenses of the United Kingdom.

When the 406th Fighter-Interceptor Wing reorganized in May 1956, the 406th Fighter-Interceptor Group was inactivated and the squadron assigned directly to wing headquarters. The squadron was awarded the Hughes Trophy as the best interceptor unit in the Air Force for the calendar year 1957. In February 1958, the 406th Wing began phasing down its operations as it prepared for inactivation. In connection with this drawdown, the squadron moved to Sembach Air Base, Germany on 24 March 1958 and was reassigned to the 86th Fighter-Interceptor Wing.  However, while Sembach's runways could accommodate the squadron's Sabres, they were too short to safely operate more modern interceptors and the squadron was inactivated on 1 July 1959.

Tactical fighter operations in Germany

The squadron was reactivated at Ramstein Air Base as the 512th Tactical Fighter Squadron on 15 November 1976. The squadron was equipped with McDonnell F-4E Phantom IIs that became available when the 36th Tactical Fighter Wing at Bitburg Air Base, Germany received McDonnell Douglas F-15A Eagles.  The squadron upgraded to General Dynamics F-16 Fighting Falcons in 1985.  It supported numerous military units located in the area and participated in numerous exercises that provided the wing with air combat tactics training essential to their mission.

In 1994 the decision was made to change the 86th Wing to the airlift mission previously held by the 435th Airlift Wing at Rhein-Main Air Base, Germany, which was slated for transfer to the German government to be merged into Frankfurt Airport. The 512th was inactivated on 1 October 1994, and most of its aircraft and personnel moved to Aviano Air Base, Italy, where they were used to form the 510th Fighter Squadron.

Lineage
 Constituted as the 628th Bombardment Squadron (Dive) on 4 February 1943
 Activated on 1 March 1943
 Redesignated 512th Fighter-Bomber Squadron on 10 August 1943
 Redesignated 512th Fighter Squadron on 30 May 1944
 Inactivated on 20 August 1946
 Redesignated 512th Fighter-Bomber Squadron on 25 June 1952
 Activated on 10 July 1952
 Redesignated 512th Fighter-Interceptor Squadron on 1 April 1954
 Redesignated 512th Fighter-Day Squadron on 8 August 1954
 Redesignated 512th Fighter-Interceptor Squadron on 8 September 1955
 Inactivated on 1 July 1959
 Redesignated 512th Tactical Fighter Squadron
 Activated on 15 November 1976
 Redesignated 512th Fighter Squadron on 1 May 1991
 Inactivated on 1 October 1994

Assignments
 406th Bombardment Group (later 406th Fighter-Bomber Group, 406th Fighter Group), 1 March 1943 – 20 August 1946
 406th Fighter-Bomber Group (later 406th Fighter-Interceptor Group), 10 July 1952
 406th Fighter-Interceptor Wing, 1 May 1956
 86th Fighter-Interceptor Wing, 24 March 1958 – 1 July 1959
 86th Tactical Fighter Group, 15 November 1976
 86th Tactical Fighter Wing, 15 June 1985
 86th Operations Group, 1 May 1991 – 1 October 1994

Stations

 Key Field, Mississippi, 1 March 1943
 Congaree Army Air Field, South Carolina, 18 September 1943 – 13 March 1944
 RAF Ashford (AAF-417), England, 6 April 1944
 Tour-en-Bessin Airfield (A-13), France, c. 27 July 1944
 Cretteville Airfield (A-14), France, 17 August 1944
 Saint-Léonard Airfield (A-36), France, c. 4 September 1944
 Mourmelon-le-Grand Airfield (A-80), France, 24 September 1944
 Metz Airfield (Y-34), France, 31 January 1945
 Asch Airfield (Y-29), Belgium, 8 February 1945
 Münster-Handorf Airfield (Y-94), Germany, 15 April 1945
 AAF Station Nordholz (R-56), Germany, c. 5 June 1945 – 20 August 1946
 RAF Manston, England, 10 July 1952
 Soesterberg Air Base, Netherlands, 1 November 1954
 RAF Bentwaters, England, 8 September 1955 – 24 March 1958
 Sembach Air Base, Germany, 24 March 1958 – 1 July 1959
 Ramstein Air Base, Germany, 15 November 1976 – 1 October 1994

Aircraft

 Douglas A-20 Havoc, 1943
 Douglas A-24 Banshee, 1943
 Curtiss A-25 Shrike, 1943
 Douglas A-26 Invader, 1943
 Vultee A-35 Vengeance, 1943
 North American A-36 Apache, 1943
 Cessna UC-78 Bobcat, 1943
 North American BC-1, 1943
 Bell P-39 Airacobra, 1943
 Curtiss P-40 Warhawk, 1943
 Republic P-47 Thunderbolt, 1943–1946
 Republic F-84 Thunderjet, 1952–1953
 North American F-86 Sabre, 1953–1959
 McDonnell F-4E Phantom II, 1976–1985
 General Dynamics F-16 Fighting Falcon, 1985–1994

Awards and campaigns

1957 Hughes Trophy

See also

 List of Douglas A-26 Invader operators
 List of F-86 Sabre units
 McDonnell Douglas F-4 Phantom II non-U.S. operators
 General Dynamics F-16 Fighting Falcon operators

References

Notes
 Explanatory notes

 Citations

Bibliography

 
 
 
 
 * 
 
 
 

Fighter squadrons of the United States Air Force
Fighter squadrons of the United States Army Air Forces
Military units and formations of the United States in the Cold War